General elections were held in Puerto Rico on Tuesday, November 2, 2004. After a count by the State Commission of Elections, the winner was inaugurated to a four-year term as Governor of Puerto Rico on January 2, 2005.

The post of Governor of Puerto Rico and the entire House of Representatives and the entire Senate, as well as the Mayors of the municipalities of Puerto Rico, and the Resident Commissioner were also elected for four-year terms.

For the first time in Puerto Rican history, citizens unable to mobilize to voting colleges for medical reasons, but capable of practicing their right to vote, were visited in their own homes and hospitals so that they could exercise their vote.

Candidates for Governor
 Aníbal Acevedo Vilá for the Popular Democratic Party
 Pedro Rosselló for the New Progressive Party
 Ruben Berrios for the Puerto Rican Independence Party

Candidates for Resident Commissioner
 Edwin Irizarry Mora for the Puerto Rican Independence Party
 Luis Fortuño for the New Progressive Party
 Roberto Prats for the Popular Democratic Party

Results
Results were announced by the State Commission of Elections (CEE-PUR) on November 2–3, 2004 after the voting colleges closed on November 2 at 3:00 p.m. AST.

On November 3, after 1,970,759 votes (98.3% of the total votes) were computed, Aníbal Acevedo Vilá (PPD) was certified preliminarily as winning for Governor of Puerto Rico. On the other hand, Luis Fortuño (PNP) was certified as Resident Commissioner, while the Senate and the House of Representatives were also dominated by the New Progressive Party. 

The preliminary certification was signed by Gerardo Cruz, electoral commissioner of the Popular Democratic Party (PPD), Brunilda Ortiz, alternate electoral commissioner of the New Progressive Party (PNP), and Andrés Miranda Rosa, alternate electoral commissioner of the Puerto Rican Independence Party (PIP). The alternate commissioners were authorized by the electoral commissioners in property of their party, Thomas Rivera Schatz (PNP) and Juan Dalmau (PIP).

Recount and shared government

Acevedo Vilá's margin of victory over Pedro Rosselló was of 3,566 (0.2%) votes, whereas Luis Fortuño had 11,137 (0.49%) votes of advantage against Roberto Prats for Resident Commissioner. Due to the small margin of victory being, the Puerto Rican electoral laws state that a recount must be performed, and that once this recount is finished, the official winner will be certified by the CEE-PUR. The recount started on Monday, November 9 as established by law, and had to finish by December 31 or earlier.

During the period, Rosselló filed a civil lawsuit against Acevedo Vilá himself over a dispute of certain ballots that were cast during the elections. This led to a protracted controversy involving appeals to the United States federal courts and the Supreme Court of Puerto Rico. The ballots in question were cast by marking the Puerto Rican Independence Party or New Progressive Party (i.e. marking a cross under the emblem of one of these parties) in addition to placing individual candidate marks (crosses) in favor of Acevedo Vilá as the candidate for governor of the Popular Democratic Party and Roberto Prats, the Popular Democratic Party's candidate for Resident Commissioner. The mark indicating the selection of a political party selects that party's slate of candidates by default, but the voter can also select individual candidates from other parties to replace candidates from the default slate.

The controversy reached the Supreme Court of Puerto Rico, which ruled 4–3 that the ballots in question were valid. In its initial opinion, the Supreme Court majority interpreted the challenged ballots as indicating that voters were voting for the PIP as a party for the purposes of stating party affiliation (and for the PIP's default slate) but had decided to move their votes to individual candidates from other party's slates. This type of vote, described as a "mixed vote", is permitted in Rule 50 of the State Election Commission's rules, based on the Commonwealth's Electoral Law as amended in 2004, Title 2, Section 2.001, Subsection 3. The practice is therefore considered legal and has been published in the official voter's instructions by the State Election Commission for quite some time. This voting option was also allowed and seen in the 1996 and 2000 elections, and had never been contested before, either at the Legislature or by the NPP's Electoral Commissioner. The individual votes for candidates not from the voter's selected party are then deducted from the votes given to the default candidates of the voter's party. The end result is a single vote per candidate.

At the same time, Rosselló challenged the ballots on the United States District Court for the District of Puerto Rico where District Judge Daniel Domínguez ordered the Puerto Rico Election Commission to count the disputed votes but to not adjudicate them to any candidate until he reached a decision on the merits of the case. Acevedo Vilá and his team challenged this ruling and the case moved up to the United States Court of Appeals for the First Circuit, where three judges ruled the question of whether or not the ballots were properly cast was not a federal constitutional issue in the case Rosselló-González v. Calderón-Serra and therefore should be decided by the Supreme Court of Puerto Rico at the Commonwealth level. The Supreme Court affirmed its prior 4–3 decision. On December 28, 2004, the recount ended and Acevedo Vilá was certified as winner and therefore Governor elected. Once the official winners were announced, they were inaugurated to four-year terms on January 2, 2005.

PIP loses its franchise
On a different note, the Puerto Rican Independence Party was unable to reach 3% of the total votes on the preliminary results, putting in risk their franchise as a principal political party by Puerto Rican electoral laws. Because of this, the party may not receive funds from the government of Puerto Rico (consisting of $5 million USD) nor have a separate column in ballot papers on the following elections. However, Maria de Lourdes Santiago became the first woman from that party to be elected senator in the history of Puerto Rico.

Governor

Resident Commissioner

Senate

|-
! style="background-color:#E9E9E9;text-align:left;vertical-align:top;" colspan=2 |Parties
! style="background-color:#E9E9E9;text-align:right;" |DistrictVotes
! style="background-color:#E9E9E9;text-align:right;" |District%
! style="background-color:#E9E9E9;text-align:right;" |DistrictSeats
! style="background-color:#E9E9E9;text-align:right;" |At LargeVotes
! style="background-color:#E9E9E9;text-align:right;" |At Large%
! style="background-color:#E9E9E9;text-align:right;" |At LargeSeats
! style="background-color:#E9E9E9;text-align:right;" |Total
|-
| style="background-color:blue" | 
| style="text-align:left;" |New Progressive Party (Partido Nuevo Progresista)
| style="text-align:right;" |1,845,204
| style="text-align:right;" |48.6
| style="text-align:right;" |11
| style="text-align:right;" |845,228
| style="text-align:right;" |44.3
| style="text-align:right;" |6
| style="text-align:right;" |17
|-
| style="background-color:red" | 
| style="text-align:left;" |Popular Democratic Party (Partido Popular Democrático)
| style="text-align:right;" |1,768,374
| style="text-align:right;" |46.6
| style="text-align:right;" |5
| style="text-align:right;" |767,626
| style="text-align:right;" |40.3
| style="text-align:right;" |4
| style="text-align:right;" |9
|-
| style="background-color:green;" | 
| style="text-align:left;" |Puerto Rican Independence Party (Partido Independentista Puertorriqueño)
| style="text-align:right;" |160,632
| style="text-align:right;" |4.2
| style="text-align:right;" |0
| style="text-align:right;" |178,541
| style="text-align:right;" |9.4
| style="text-align:right;" |1
| style="text-align:right;" |1
|-
|| 
| style="text-align:left;" | Independent Movement of the Eastern Region (Movimiento Independiente Region Este)
| style="text-align:right;" |2,936
| style="text-align:right;" |0.1
| style="text-align:right;" |0
| style="text-align:right;" |-
| style="text-align:right;" |-
| style="text-align:right;" |-
| style="text-align:right;" |-
|-
| style="background-color:white" | 
| style="text-align:left;" | Independent
| style="text-align:right;" |-
| style="text-align:right;" |-
| style="text-align:right;" |-
| style="text-align:right;" |97,673 
| style="text-align:right;" |5.1
| style="text-align:right;" |0
| style="text-align:right;" |-
|-
| style="background-color:white" | 
| style="text-align:left;" |Others
| style="text-align:right;" |826
| style="text-align:right;" |0.0
| style="text-align:right;" |0
| style="text-align:right;" |297
| style="text-align:right;" |0.0
| style="text-align:right;" |0
| style="text-align:right;" |-
|-
|style="text-align:left;background-color:#E9E9E9" colspan=2|Total (turnout 81.7  %)
|style="text-align:right;background-color:#E9E9E9" |3,777,972
|style="text-align:right;background-color:#E9E9E9" |100.0
|style="text-align:right;background-color:#E9E9E9" |16
|style="text-align:right;background-color:#E9E9E9" |1,889,365
|style="text-align:right;background-color:#E9E9E9" |100.0
|style="text-align:right;background-color:#E9E9E9" |11
|style="text-align:right;background-color:#E9E9E9" |27
|-
| colspan=2 style="text-align:left;" | Blank and Null Votes
| style="text-align:right;" |17,245
| style="text-align:right;" |0.4
| style="text-align:right;" |-
| style="text-align:right;" |17,245
| style="text-align:right;" |0.7
| style="text-align:right;" |-
| style="text-align:right;" |-
|-
| colspan=2 style="text-align:left;" | Total votes cast
| style="text-align:right;" |3,795,217
| style="text-align:right;" |-
| style="text-align:right;" |-
| style="text-align:right;" |1,906,610
| style="text-align:right;" |-
| style="text-align:right;" |-
| style="text-align:right;" |-
|-
| colspan=8 style="text-align:left;" |Source:  Elections Puerto Rico
|-

House of Representatives

References

 "2004 General Elections". State Commission of Elections of Puerto Rico. San Juan, Puerto Rico. November 3, 2004.
 CEE preliminarily certifies Acevedo Vilá and Fortuño. San Juan, Puerto Rico: El Nuevo Día. November 3, 2004.

External links

 State Commission of Elections of Puerto Rico - official site (in Spanish)

2004
 
Puerto Rico
General election